Never Will: Live from a Distance is a extended play (EP) by American country singer-songwriter Ashley McBryde. It was released on May 28, 2021 via Warner Music Nashville and contained six tracks. The EP was released to substitute for McBryde's absence from touring during the COVID-19 pandemic. It was McBryde's second EP released in her music career.

Background, content, and release
In 2020, Ashley McBryde released her second studio album titled Never Will. Although critically acclaimed, she was not able to tour or promote the record due to the COVID-19 pandemic, which shut down any plans for touring. "We released Never Will on April 3 last year, so we went straight from rehearsals for a tour to not seeing each other in person for months," she explained. The album included six tracks originally released on Never Will. According to McBryde, the live songs were recorded in the same way they would sound on tour. "Getting together to rehearse and record these live versions safely was our way of giving the fans a taste of what they would have seen had the world not changed so much," she explained in a press statement.

The six tracks on the EP were all recorded live. With the exception of the second track "Shut Up Sheila", all songs were co-composed by McBryde herself. Also included was "Martha Divine", a song released as a single off her 2020 studio album. At the time of the EP's release, the studio verision of the song was a single at country radio. Never Will: Live from a Distance was released on May 28, 2021 on Warner Music Nashville. It was available to digital and streaming sites upon its release. A concert was included as part of the promotional package of the album. The concert premiered on McBryde's official YouTube channel.

Track listing

Personnel
All credits are adapted from AllMusic.

Musical personnel
 Chris Harris – Background vocals, guitar
 Mark Helmkamp – Background vocals, guitar
 Quinn Hill – Drums
 Ashley McBryde – Guitar, lead vocals
 Christian Sancho – Bass

Technical personnel
 Logan Hanna – Engineering, mixing
 Courtney Warner – Digital recording engineer, editing, mixing engineer
 Terry Watson – Mastering

Release history

References

2021 EPs
Ashley McBryde EPs
Warner Records albums